25 Years is a 2009 EP by Middle Class Rut, released on May 26, 2009, under exclusive Worldwide license to Bright Antenna. The EP was released as a digital download, CD and 12" record.

Track listing

25 Years - 4:01
Dead Set - 4:41
I Guess You Could Say - 4:17
Busy Bein Born - 4:49
Tied Up - 3:51
I Don't Really Know - 6:24

References

2009 EPs
Middle Class Rut albums